Foulkes, Ffoulkes or ffoulkes may refer to:

Angela Foulkes (born 1948), English-born New Zealand trade unionist 
Annie Foulkes (1877-1962), Welsh writer and teacher of French
 Charles ffoulkes (1868–1947), British historian
 Edmund Ffoulkes (1819–1894), British clergyman
 Bill Foulkes (1932–2013), English footballer
 Billy Foulkes (1926–1979), Welsh footballer
 Carly Foulkes (b. 1988), Canadian model
 Charles Foulkes (disambiguation), several people with the name
 Constance Jocelyn Ffoulkes (1858–1950), art historian 
 George Ernest Foulkes (1878–1960), American politician
 George Foulkes, Baron Foulkes of Cumnock (born 1942), Scottish politician
 Helena Foulkes (b. 1963), American executive
 John Foulkes (1861–1935), Australian politician
 Nick Foulkes (born c. 1963), British journalist
 Robert Foulkes (1634-1679), Church of England clergyman and murderer
 S. H. Foulkes (1898–1976), Jewish psychiatrist and psychoanalyst

Surnames of Welsh origin